Paulão is a Portuguese nickname derived from Paulo, meaning "Great Paul" or "Big Paul". Notable people known as Paulão include:

Paulão (born 1963), Brazilian volleyball player born Paulo André Jukoski da Silva
Paulão (footballer, born 1969) (born 1969), Angolan football midfielder born Paulo António Alves
Paulão (born 1967), Brazilian football defender born Paulo César Batista dos Santos
Paulão Moreira (born 1969), Brazilian beach volleyball player born Paulo Roberto Moreira da Costa
Paulão (born 1973), Brazilian football defender born Paulo Frederico Benevenute
Paulão (born 1982), Brazilian football defender born Paulo Afonso Santos Júnior
Paulão (born 1985), Brazilian football striker born Paulo Roberto do Carmo
Paulão (born 1986), Brazilian football defender born Paulo Marcos de Jesus Ribeiro
Paulão (footballer, born 1989), Brazilian football defender born Luis Paulo da Silva
Paulão Prestes (born 1988), Brazilian basketball player born Paulo Sérgio Prestes

See also
Paulinho (disambiguation), the opposite, Little Paul

Portuguese masculine given names